Pterotocera is a genus of moths in the family Geometridae. The genus was described by Staudinger in 1882.

Species
Pterotocera ussurica Djakonov, 1949
Pterotocera insignilinearia Beljaev, 1994
Pterotocera declinata Staudinger, 1882
Pterotocera suidunaria (Alphéraky, 1883)
Pterotocera armeniacae Djakonov, 1949

References

Bistonini